Darren J. Haydar (born October 22, 1979) is a Canadian former professional ice hockey winger. Haydar was selected by the Nashville Predators in the ninth round (248th overall) of the 1999 NHL Entry Draft. He is one of the top AHL players of all-time, having won two Calder Cup championships and is the AHL’s all-time leader in playoff goals (63), assists (80) and points (143). Despite his prowess in the AHL, Haydar played little in the NHL, scoring only a single goal and eight points over 23 games.

Playing career
Prior to turning professional Haydar played two years with the Milton Merchants of the Junior A Ontario Provincial Hockey League, where he established league records for goals (71) and points (140) in a season. He then spent four years (1998–2002) for the University of New Hampshire, scoring 219 points with 102 goals. In 2002, he was named a First Team All-American and was Hockey East Player of the Year.

He was drafted 248th overall by Nashville Predators in the 1999 NHL Entry Draft. On September 11, 2002, Haydar signed a three-year entry level contract with the Predators. He spent almost all of his Predators career at their farm team as a standout with the Milwaukee Admirals of the American Hockey League, only playing twice for the Predators, both in the 2002–03 NHL season. He helped the Admirals win the Calder Cup in the 2003–04 season.

Haydar was signed by the Atlanta Thrashers as a Free Agent on July 4, 2006. He was assigned to affiliate the Chicago Wolves for the 2006–07 season. On December 23, 2006, Haydar picked up a point in his 32nd consecutive game, breaking the record for the longest AHL scoring streak. The stick used by Haydar as well as the hockey puck involved in the record-breaking point were preserved in the Hockey Hall of Fame in Toronto. He went on to notch a point in 39 consecutive games, tallying 79 points during the streak. At season's end Haydar finished with 122 points in 73 games. He was named in the AHL's First All-Star Team and won the Les Cunningham Award for being the AHL's most valuable player.

In the 2007–08 season, Haydar again was relied heavily upon with the Wolves, and was instrumental in helping the Wolves win the Calder Cup, his second. Darren also played as a reserve forward with the Thrashers and scored his first NHL goal on October 13, 2007, against Martin Brodeur in a 6-5 loss to the New Jersey Devils.

For the 2008–09 season, Haydar was signed by the Detroit Red Wings on July 23, 2008. He was assigned to and named captain of affiliate the Grand Rapids Griffins, leading the Griffins in scoring with 80 points in 79 games. As a result, was named in the 2008–09 AHL's Second All-Star Team.

On July 4, 2009, Haydar was signed by the Colorado Avalanche to a one-year contract. Haydar was reassigned by the Avalanche to affiliate, the Lake Erie Monsters, prior to the 2009–10 season. While leading the Monsters in scoring, Darren was named to play in the 2010 AHL All-Star game but missed the game due to injury. Upon his return Haydar was recalled by the injury hit Avalanche on February 10, 2010. He made his Avalanche debut and played his first NHL game since 2007 on the same day in a 4-3 overtime win against the Thrashers. Haydar was returned to the Monsters and in the last game of the season he recorded an assist, to become the 43rd player in history to reach 600 points.

A free agent at season's end, Haydar signed an AHL contract to return to the team he formerly captained, the Chicago Wolves on July 28, 2010. In 2013, as part of the Milwaukee Admirals celebrating their 35th season, Haydar was voted by fans as the 3rd greatest Milwaukee Admiral of all time.

After three further seasons with the Wolves, Haydar left North America for the first time in his career and signed a one-year contract in Europe with EHC München of the DEL on July 25, 2013.

In 2013, he was added to the Team Canada roster for the 2013 Spengler Cup. Haydar finished in a tie with Byron Ritchie for the team scoring lead with a pair of goals and four assists.

Upon completing a single season in the DEL on June 9, 2014, he signed a one-year contract, along with former Wolves teammate, Jason Krog, in the Kontinental Hockey League with Croatian club, KHL Medveščak Zagreb. In the 2014–15 season, having recorded just 1 assist in 4 games, Haydar opted to leave the club. With Krog following suit, they both signed a try-out contract with Austrian club, EC VSV, on October 2, 2014. After showing early scoring touch in Villach, Krog and Haydar both opted to remain signing a one-year contract on October 15, 2014.

In the off-season, Haydar left Villach as a free agent and returned to play for a second stint in Germany after signing with Lausitzer Füchse of the DEL2 on September 28, 2015.

Suffering an off-season training back injury, Haydar has opted to sit out the 2016–17 season — having recently returned to Milton after three seasons in Europe and in the midst of making plans for his post-playing future. He later concluded his professional career in accepting a position as a sales representative at a real estate entity in Milton, Ontario, working alongside his older brother Ryan, who was also a hockey player but now has officially retired.

In 2018, Haydar was inducted into his hometown Milton Sports Hall of Fame along with his teammates on the 1996-98 Milton Merchant teams. In 2019, Haydar was inducted into the same hall as a standalone athlete inductee. In 2020, the Milwaukee Admirals retired Haydar's jersey and celebrate his accomplishments with a bobble-head night.

Personal
After first experiencing symptoms in 2012, Haydar was diagnosed over a year later with multiple sclerosis and has organized a charity golf tournament in support of the MS Society of Canada’s Hamilton-Halton Chapter since 2017. He is married to Sara, who is a throat cancer survivor, and he has three sons. He works in real estate with his older brother, Ryan.

Career statistics

Regular season and playoffs

Awards and honors

OPJHL

NCAA

AHL

Records
 AHL All-Time Playoff goals record- 59
 AHL All-Time Playoff assist record- 76
 AHL All-Time Playoff points record- 135

References

External links

1979 births
Living people
Atlanta Thrashers players
Canadian ice hockey right wingers
Chicago Wolves players
Colorado Avalanche players
EHC München players
Grand Rapids Griffins players
KHL Medveščak Zagreb players
Lake Erie Monsters players
Lausitzer Füchse players
Milwaukee Admirals players
Ice hockey people from Ontario
Sportspeople from Milton, Ontario
Nashville Predators draft picks
Nashville Predators players
New Hampshire Wildcats men's ice hockey players
EC VSV players
Canadian expatriate ice hockey players in Austria
Canadian expatriate ice hockey players in Croatia
Canadian expatriate ice hockey players in Germany
AHCA Division I men's ice hockey All-Americans